is a Japanese male curler.

At the national level, he is a 2018 Japan men's champion curler.

Teams

References

External links

Video: 

Living people
1984 births
Japanese male curlers
Japanese curling champions